Rohit or Rohitas, also called Bhambi Rohit and Bhambi Khalpa, who are sub-caste and sub-community from Gujarat, India.

Rohit consider themselves to be followers or descendants of the Bhakti Movement saint Ravidas. Traditionally, they did leather or hide work and were identified as Khalpa. But in 1947, a group of Khalpa organized and decided to call themselves Rohit. They also abandoned all leather works but practiced consumption of non-veg.

From the 1930-40s Rohits were active in changing their caste name from Khalpa to Rohit, like others such as Dheds to Mahyavanshis, Garua to Guru, and Bhangi to Rishi. Only Mahyavanshis were successful in getting official recognition from the Government of India to get a Kshatriya status officially.

Surname

The Rohit community has number of ataks (surnames) apart from Rohit generally used by them.

References

See also
Rohit - a Hindu name.

Dalit communities
Shudra castes
Social groups of India
Indian surnames
Scheduled Castes of Uttar Pradesh
Scheduled Castes of Rajasthan
Scheduled Castes of Madhya Pradesh
Scheduled Castes of Delhi
Scheduled Castes of Gujarat
Scheduled Castes of Chhattisgarh